Brick by Brick is a 1990 album by Iggy Pop.

Brick by Brick may also refer to:

"Brick by Brick" (Arctic Monkeys song), from their 2011 album Suck It and See
"Brick by Brick", a 2009 song by Katy Perry from her live album MTV Unplugged
"Brick by Brick", a 2009 song by Train from their album Save Me, San Francisco
"Brick by Brick", a 1997 song from the soundtrack of Lego Island.
Brick by Brick (band), a hardcore/metal hybrid band